The Rothberg International School (Hebrew:ע"ש רוטברג  בית הספר לתלמידים מחוץ לארץ, Beit ha-Sefer le-Talmidim mi-Chutz la-Aretz al shem Rothberg; abbreviated RIS), is a school for international students at the Hebrew University of Jerusalem. It offers programs for undergraduate students, graduate students, summer courses, researchers and new immigrants. The school is housed in the Boyar Building on the university’s Mt. Scopus campus. It hosts approximately 2,500 students from 90 countries on an annual basis.

History 

The Rothberg International School began at the initiative of Samuel Rothberg, an influential American businessman and Zionist who was heavily involved in the development of The Hebrew University. It started in 1955 with twenty-one students from the United States. 

The program continued during the 1960s and expanded to include summer courses and an intensive summer Hebrew language program. The Preparatory Program for New Immigrants (Mechina le-Olim) was established in 1965. The events of the Six Day War in June 1967 led to an increase in the number of overseas students at the Hebrew University, particularly from American students who wanted a study abroad experience. Several international programs at the university such as the One Year Program, the Preparatory Year Program, the Hebrew Ulpan (language course) and Summer Courses were consolidated into the School for Overseas Students in 1971. The school became the first academic unit to relocate from its Givat Ram campus to the Mount Scopus campus. 

In 1981, the school was renamed The Rothberg School for Overseas Students

Academic programs 
The Rothberg International School has undergraduate, graduate, non-degree and short-term programs, in addition to the Mechina (Preparatory) program.

Undergraduate Studies 
The school offers a Division of Undergraduate Studies for those pursuing a bachelor’s degree outside Israel. There are also programs in Dance, Art and Design, Arabic, Music, and internships in Technology and Innovation. There is also a program developed with Harvard University.

Graduate Studies 
The Division of Graduate Studies currently offers five graduate degree options in Jewish Studies, The Bible and the Ancient Near East, Israel Studies, Middle Eastern Studies, Non-Profit Management and Leadership. Graduate students may join a non-degree program and choose from any of the courses offered in the graduate division.

Mechina (Preparatory Program) 
The Preparatory (Mechina) Program is for students from overseas not yet able to enroll in an undergraduate degree program in Israel. Mechina students are either in the process of becoming Israeli citizens or have recently immigrated to Israel. It is the largest academic preparatory program in Israel.

Historically, the student body of the Mechina program has reflected the immigration trends in Israel. When Operation Moses (1984) and Operation Solomon (1991) brought Ethiopian Jewish immigrants to Israel, the Mechina had an increase in Ethiopian students. In 1991, with the 1990s post-Soviet aliyah, four times the number of students from the Former Soviet Union enrolled than the previous year.

List of Provosts & Vice-Provosts

Provosts

Vice-Provosts

Notable alumni 

 Wolf Blitzer – American journalist, television news anchor and author 
 Nathan Englander – American novelist
 Tom Friedman – American journalist
 Alexander Gould – American actor and voice artist
 Ambassador Martin Indyk – US Ambassador to Israel
 Eugene Kandel - Israeli economist
 Ambassador Daniel Kurtzer – US Ambassador to Israel
Steve Linde (born 1960) - newspaperman 
 Dr. Deborah Lipstadt – American professor of modern Jewish history
 Natalie Portman – American-Israeli actress and filmmaker
 Ambassador Daniel Shapiro – US Ambassador to Israel
 Bari Weiss – American journalist
 Efraim Zuroff – Israeli historian and Nazi hunter

References

External links
 The Hebrew University of Jerusalem 
 The Rothberg International School

Universities in Israel
Universities and colleges in Jerusalem
Mount Scopus